Ichneutica phaula is a moth of the family Noctuidae. It is endemic to New Zealand. It is found only in the South Island in the Nelson district, the eastern side of the South Island and Stewart Island. I. phaula inhabits tussock grasslands and coastal sand dunes. Host species include Ficinia spiralis, Ammophila arenaria, Poa cita and other "tussock grasses".  The adults of this species are on the wing from October to December and are attracted to sugar traps. I. phaula is similar in appearance to both I. micastra, with whom it does not share a range, and I. sapiens which differs from I. phaula as I. sapiens is darker and has a more reddish tinge.

Taxonomy 
This species was described by Edward Meyrick in 1887 from specimens bred in tussock grass. The lectotype is held at the Canterbury Museum. In 1988 J. S. Dugdale placed this species within the Tmetolophota genus. In 2019 Robert Hoare undertook a major review of New Zealand Noctuidae species. During this review the genus Ichneutica was greatly expanded and the genus Tmetolophota was subsumed into that genus as a synonym. As a result of this review, this species is now known as Ichneutica phaula.

Description 

Meyrick described this species as follows:
The adult male has a wingspan of between 32 and 40 mm and the adult female has a wingspan of between 36 and 45 mm. This species is very similar in appearance to I. micastra, although the ranges of the two species appears not to overlap. I. phaula can be distinguished as there is a difference in pectinations on its antennae. Also both male and female I. phaula are lighter and less chunky than I. micastra. I. phaula is also similar to I. sapiens but I. phaula tends to be a paler species with I. sapiens having a more reddish tinge.

Distribution 

I. phaula is endemic to New Zealand. This species is found only in the South Island, in the Nelson district, on the eastern side of the South Island and on Stewart Island.

Habitat 
This species has been found in tussock grasslands as well as in coastal sand dunes.

Behaviour 
Adults of this species are on the wing from October to December and are attracted to sugar traps.

Life history and host species 

Some portions of this species life history is unknown but the larval host species include Ficinia spiralis, Ammophila arenaria, Poa cita and other "tussock grasses".

References

Moths described in 1887
Moths of New Zealand
Hadeninae
Endemic fauna of New Zealand
Taxa named by Edward Meyrick
Endemic moths of New Zealand